GKC may refer to:
 Greater Kansas City, a metropolitan area at the Missouri/Kansas Border in the United States of America
 G. K. Chesterton (1874–1936), English writer
 Gesenius–Kautsch–Cowley, a Hebrew lexicon
 Gorakhpur Cantonment railway station, in Uttar Pradesh, India
 Govinda K.C., Nepalese physician
 Greenock Central railway station, in Scotland
 Gunnerkrigg Court, a science-fantasy webcomic